Albert Warner (born 5 July 1921) was a former South African cricket umpire. He stood in two Test matches, both South Africa vs. Australia, in 1970.

See also
 List of Test cricket umpires

References

1921 births
Possibly living people
People from Wychavon (district)
South African Test cricket umpires